Olena Kozakova Pavlukhina (born 1 March 1989) is a Ukrainian-born Azerbaijani road and track cyclist. She is serving a four-year suspension from the sport, until 13 January 2023, following an anti-doping rule violation for the use of Prohibited Methods and/or Prohibited Substances.

She participated at the 2011 UCI Road World Championships and 2012 UCI Road World Championships. In 2015, she won the Azerbaijani National Road Race Championships, the Azerbaijani National Time Trial Championships, and finished sixth at the inaugural European Games time trial. In 2016, she won the second stage and overall of Gracia–Orlová.

35th place at the Olympic Games WE - Road Race 2016 One day race Rio de Janeiro (136.9km)

Major results

2007
 9th Time trial, UCI Juniors World Championships
 9th Time trial, UEC European Junior Road Championships
2012
 2nd Time trial, Ukrainian National Road Championships
 8th Overall Gracia-Orlová
2014
 Grand Prix Galichyna
1st Points race
3rd Scratch
 3rd Scratch, Fenioux Trophy Piste
2015
 Azerbaijani National Road Championships
1st  Road race
1st  Time trial
 2nd Scratch, Grand Prix Galichyna
 5th Chrono des Nations
 6th Time trial, European Games
2016
 Azerbaijani National Road Championships
1st  Road race
1st  Time trial
 1st Overall Gracia–Orlová
1st Stage 2
 4th Overall Tour of Zhoushan Island
 9th Time trial, UEC European Road Championships
 9th Overall Tour of Chongming Island
2017
Azerbaijani National Road Championships
1st  Road race
1st  Time trial
8th Ljubljana–Domžale–Ljubljana TT
2018
 Azerbaijani National Road Championships
1st  Road race
1st  Time trial

References

External links
 
 

Azerbaijani female cyclists
Ukrainian female cyclists
Living people
People from Horlivka
1989 births
Cyclists at the 2015 European Games
European Games competitors for Azerbaijan
Cyclists at the 2016 Summer Olympics
Olympic cyclists of Azerbaijan
Ukrainian emigrants to Azerbaijan
Naturalized citizens of Azerbaijan
Sportspeople from Donetsk Oblast